The British Swimming Championships - 1,500 metres freestyle winners formerly the (Amateur Swimming Association (ASA) National Championships) are listed below.

The event was originally contested over the mile and then 1,650 yards and then switched to the metric conversion of 1,500 metres in 1971. Throughout much of the history of the event it was contested by men only because the women competed in the 800 metres freestyle but more recently both events are now contested by both sexes.

1,500 metres freestyle champions

See also
British Swimming
List of British Swimming Championships champions

References

Swimming in the United Kingdom